Surfa Sam was Australia's first skateboard manufacturing companies founded in 1963 by Leo Kalokerinos in Rose Bay, New South Wales.

See also

List of skateboarding brands

References

External links

Manufacturing companies established in 1963
Australian companies established in 1963
Sporting goods manufacturers of Australia
Skateboarding companies
Manufacturing companies based in Sydney